Abu Mansour al-Maghribi is a Moroccan citizen, former electrical engineer and self-claimed unofficial "ambassador of ISIS in Turkey". He claimed that he has been in charge of setting up border collaboration between ISIS and Turkey, mainly relative to migrations to ISIS territories, border security, and healthcare support to injured ISIS soldiers. With internal ISIS divisions and the first ISIS terror attack on Turkey, the relationship soured. Al-Maghribi was captured by SDF troops, and testified his action to various foreign journalists. However, some of what he says may likely be exaggeration. He has also claimed that ISIS received financial aid from Qatar and Israel and that he was communicating with several Israeli officials who allowed ISIS to use their hospitals for emergencies.

References

External links 
 "ISIS ambassador to Turkey" cooperated with high-level officials in Ankara – Homeland Sec Today 2019-03-18
 The ISIS Ambassador to Turkey March 18, 2019 Anne Speckhard and Ardian Shajkovci

Electrical engineers
Islamic State of Iraq and the Levant members
Living people
Year of birth missing (living people)